The Trnovo Bridge is a bridge crossing the Gradaščica River in Ljubljana, the capital of Slovenia. It is located in front of Trnovo Church at the end of Karun Street to the south of the city centre and is a continuation of Emona Street. It connects the neighborhoods of Krakovo and Trnovo, the oldest Ljubljana suburbs, known for their market gardens and cultural events. A bridge has stood on the site since the late 17th century. The modern bridge was built between 1928 and 1932 by the constructor Matko Curk upon the plans of the architect Jože Plečnik. It is distinguished by its width and the trees that it bears. It is the most prominent object of Plečnik's renovation of the banks of the Gradaščica.

Architecture
It is supported from below by a stone arch. Each of its corners is capped with a small pyramid, a signature motif of Plečnik's, designed in the same way as the spires of the church. The mid-span features a pair of Art-Deco male sculptures. The bridge is among the rare with live trees. Two rows of birches divide the pedestrian and vehicle lanes, intentionally obscuring the bridge silhouette. They are complemented by a balustrade of vase-like elements and a row of short columns at each side. There is also a statue of Saint John the Baptist, the patron of the church, at the center of the bridge. It was designed by Nikolaj Pirnat. On the opposite side stands a slender obelisk with a lamp. It has been dedicated to Sigmund Zois, a naturalist and patron of science and arts. On the Krakovo side, a stone tablet with the inscription KRAKOVU 'to Krakovo' is mounted on the face of the bridge. On the Trnovo side, there is a stone tablet that reads TRNOVU 'to Trnovo'.

References

External links

Bridges in Ljubljana
Bridges completed in 1932
Jože Plečnik buildings
Bridges over the Gradaščica
Arch bridges in Slovenia
20th-century architecture in Slovenia